Yessica Coraima Oviedo Pérez (born 2 January 1993) is a Dominican Republic freestyle wrestler. She is a four-time medalist at the Pan American Wrestling Championships and a three-time medalist, including gold, at the Bolivarian Games. She is also a bronze medalist at the Central American and Caribbean Games.

Career 

She won the silver medal in the women's 55kg event at the 2013 Pan American Wrestling Championships held in Panama City, Panama. She won one of the bronze medals in her event at the 2013 Bolivarian Games held in Trujillo, Peru.

In 2017, she won the silver medal in the women's 58kg event at the Pan American Wrestling Championships held in Lauro de Freitas, Brazil. She competed in the women's 58kg event at the World Wrestling Championships in Paris, France. She won the gold medal in her event at the 2017 Bolivarian Games held in Santa Marta, Colombia.

She lost her bronze medal match in the women's 57kg event at the 2018 Pan American Wrestling Championships held in Lima, Peru. She won the bronze medal in the her event at the 2018 Central American and Caribbean Games held in Barranquilla, Colombia.

In 2020, she competed at the Pan American Olympic Qualification Tournament without qualifying for the 2020 Summer Olympics in Tokyo, Japan. She also failed to qualify for the Olympics at the 2021 World Olympic Qualification Tournament held in Sofia, Bulgaria.

She won the silver medal in the women's 68kg event at the 2021 Pan American Wrestling Championships held in Guatemala City, Guatemala.

She won one of the bronze medals in the women's 68kg event at the 2022 Pan American Wrestling Championships held in Acapulco, Mexico. She won the bronze medal in her event at the 2022 Bolivarian Games held in Valledupar, Colombia.

Achievements

References

External links 
 

Living people
1993 births
Place of birth missing (living people)
Dominican Republic female sport wrestlers
Pan American Wrestling Championships medalists
Central American and Caribbean Games bronze medalists for the Dominican Republic
Competitors at the 2010 Central American and Caribbean Games
Competitors at the 2014 Central American and Caribbean Games
Competitors at the 2018 Central American and Caribbean Games
Central American and Caribbean Games medalists in wrestling
21st-century Dominican Republic women